The Samsung Galaxy S III Progre (Galaxy Esley ProgreScroel Nichi) is a mobile phone developed for the domestic market by Samsung Electronics of Korea (importer: Samsung Telecommunications Japan), KDDI and Okinawa. It uses au brand CDMA 1X WIN, and 3.9-generation mobile communication system (au 4G LTE) smartphone. The product number is SCH-J 021.

Au version 
In the au version of Galaxy S III, the basic performance is almost the same as SC - 06D which was released for NTT DoCoMo.

However, its appearance is somewhat different, and in the global and DoCoMo version the glass part of the display, which had been shaped to protrude from the surrounding frame, instead the frame part protrudes above the glass surface. In addition, a strap attachment hole is available. The antenna for Osaifu-Keitai is not built in the rechargeable battery but attached to the battery lid.

Its length is 2 mm longer, and is 2 g heavier.

It does not support NFC/ infrared communication and is not waterproof.

The SAR value of this machine is 0.275 W / kg, which is the lowest as of November 2012 as an existing smartphone for au, including corporate users.

History 
 2012 (Heisei 24) October 17 - KDDI and official announcement from Samsung Telecommunications Japan.
 October 20, 2012 - Pass through the Federal Communications Commission (FCC).
 November 2, 2012 - Release in Hokkaido, Kanto and Okinawa districts.
 November 9, 2012 - Release in the remaining districts.
 November 12, 2013 - Start updating to Android 4.1.

Update 
On November 12, 013 the phone's OS received a version upgrade:
 Smart rotation function
 Page buddy function
 Pop-up play available with One Seg
 Multi-window function
 Facebook added to the information telop displayed on the lock screen
 "Image", "movie", "music", "document" categories in My Files application, and the storage destination is categorized for each data type
 Change the UI of the gallery application
 Block mode function
 Flick operation becomes available in Roman character input
 Enhanced camera function

 Continuous shooting in "Best Face Mode": choose the best smile and combine them into one picture

 Panorama mode

References 

Samsung Galaxy
Samsung smartphones
Samsung mobile phones